Tungag, or Lavongai, is an Austronesian language of New Ireland Province, Papua New Guinea, localized  New Hanover, the native name of which is .

Since Lavongai is an Austronesian language, it follows several of the unique characteristics of this language group. Examples include the specific form for the singular, dual, trial and plural tense, the clarity of knowing if the person spoken to is included or excluded in the dual, trial and plural tenses, and the defining of the possessive tense expressed by an ending added to the noun. However, unlike the languages spoken in Papua New Guinea, it has not adopted and mixed with other languages.

It is spoken on the island of New Hanover and its neighboring islands. There are different dialects of the Lavongai language. The major difference between the language dialects is between the villages of the south coast and the villages from the western tip to the islands on the north coast. There are also smaller differences between villages, but it does not have a major effect on the communication between these villages.

Its endangered level (according to Ethnologue) is 5, which means it is a language used frequently, so there is no fear that it will be endangered, but is not considered the main language of New Guinea.

Phonology
Phoneme inventory of the Tungag language:

Sound system 
(Note: These references do not include  and germinate consonants)

Alphabet 
In the Lavongai language, there are 21 letters – six vowels and fifteen consonants.

Vowels 
In the Lavongai language, there are six vowels: a, e, i, o, u, ʌ.

The other vowels, are pronounced the same as their pronunciation in the Latin language. Thus they all can be pronounced as a long vowel or a short vowel.

Consonants 
In the Lavongai language, there are 15 consonants: b, d, f, g, h, k, l, m, n, ŋ, p, r, s, t, v.

Many consonants can be replaced/deleted

f and p 
Some consider f and h letters in the alphabet, but others do not.

The letter f can usually be replaced by the letter p.

  – 'the headgear of the women'
  – 'to come back from fishing without result'

While there are some cases where p cannot replace f, the number of cases is very small.

  cannot become 
  – 'lightning'
  – 'leprosy'

b and v 
The letter b can be replaced by v.

  – 'the hornbill'
  – 'to do, the deed'
  – 'to fight, the fight'

r and d 
The letter r can be replaced by d.

  – 'to kill, the killing'
 {{lang|lcm|ororuŋ/oroduŋ} – 'to dream, the dream'
  – 'stick fast'
  – 'to meet'

h 
Unlike like the above letters, the letter h is normally dropped. Dropping the letter h in a word does not change the meaning at all.

  – 'stone'
  – 'woman/female'
  – 'nose'

Diphthongs 

However, the other diphthongs do not have a perfect sound.

The diphthong  can sometimes replace the vowel a if it is a three-letter word and between two consonants and vice versa. This practice is more common in the dialects spoken on the north coast.

  may be changed into  – 'to beat'
  may be changed into  – 'cut grass'
  may be changed into  – 'the day'
  may be changed into  – 'the morning'
  may be changed into  – 'tomorrow'

However, this replacement can not be done to every word. Listed below are some of the words that can not have use the a/au replacement.

  – 'people'
  – 'son'
  – 'dead'
  – 'to cook'

Note:  has two meanings: 'the day' or to cook'.

The diphthong  can sometimes be replaced with the vowels o or a.

  /  – 'the boys'
  /  – 'the women'
  /  – 'the shark'

and  
The diphthongs  and  can be used interchangeably.

  – 'in, the inner part, the intestines'
  – 'not, lest'

Grammar

Nouns

Proper nouns and mass nouns 
These are nouns that cannot be marked with a possession marker, nor can they be counted.

  – 'my Kerek' (Kerek is a name)
  – 'water'

Alienable and inalienably possessed nouns 
Alienable nouns are nouns that have a possessive pronoun preceding the noun.

  – 'our two names'
  – 'my wife'

Inalienable nouns are nouns that use a suffix to express the possessive.

  – 'its body'
  – 'their mouths'

Counting numbers 
When counting from one to ten, the Lavongai language counts based on groups of fives and tens.

1–4 
The numerals 'one' through 'four' are mono-morphemic words.

  – 'one'
  – 'two'
  – 'three'
  – 'four'

5 
The numeral 'five' is distinct with its two-morpheme composition.

  – 'five'

6–9 
The numerals 'six' through 'nine' are based on adding 'one' through 'four' to the numeral 'five'.

  – 'five-from-one / six'

The words for 'two' to 'four' can be shortened by omitting the first syllable and changing o to u.

  → 
  → 
  → 
  – 'five-from-four / nine'

10 
Likewise to the numeral 'five', 'ten' also has a distinct two-morpheme composition.

  – 'ten'

Sentence structure 
The Lavongai language follows the SVO (subject–verb–object) structure.

References 

Meso-Melanesian languages
Languages of New Ireland Province